Honda Motorcycle and Scooter India, Private Limited (HMSI) is the wholly owned Indian subsidiary of Honda Motor Company, Limited, Japan. Founded in 1999, it was the fourth Honda automotive venture in India, after Kinetic Honda Motor Ltd (1984–1998), Hero Honda (1984–2011) and Honda Siel Cars India (1995–2012). HMSI was established in 1999 at Manesar, District Gurgaon, Haryana.

HMSI has four manufacturing locations at Manesar in Haryana, Tapukara in Rajasthan, Narsapura, Kolar in Karnataka and Vitthalapur of Ahmedabad district in Gujarat state.

Vehicles

Motorcycles
Honda Unicorn
Honda Sp 125
Honda Shine
Honda Livo
Honda X Blade
Honda CD110 Dream DX
Honda Hornet 2.0 
Honda Adventure 200x
CB350 RS
Hness CB350
CB300F
CB200X

Scooters
 Dio
 Activa-6G
 Activa 125
 Grazia
 Forza

Sport bikes
 GoldWing
 CB1000R
 CBR650R
 CB650R
 CBR1000RR
 CB500x
Africa Twin

Discontinued

Scooters
Honda Eterno
Honda Aviator
Honda Cliq
Honda Navi
Honda Activa-i
Honda Activa (1st Generation)
Honda Activa (2nd Generation)
Honda Activa 3g
Honda Activa 4g
Honda Activa 5g

Motorcycles/Sports Bikes
Honda CB Trigger 150
Honda CB Unicorn Dazzler 150
Honda CB Twister 110
Honda CBF Stunner 125
Honda Hornet 160r
Honda CBR 150R
Honda CBR 250R
Honda CBR 650F
Honda Dream Yuga
Honda Stunner
Honda Dream Neo
Honda CB Unicorn 160
Honda CB Shine SP

ISO 14001 
HMSI got ISO 14001 certification in December 2002. HMSI plans to use the PDCA cycle for its environmental management system.

References

External links 

Honda
Vehicle manufacturing companies established in 1999
Motorcycle manufacturers of India
Scooter manufacturers
Indian subsidiaries of foreign companies
Indian companies established in 1999